Canterbury Park (formerly Canterbury Downs), is a horse racing track in Shakopee, Minnesota, United States. Canterbury Park Holding Corporation ("Canterbury Park") hosts parimutuel wagering on live thoroughbred and quarter horse racing at its facilities in Shakopee and parimutuel wagering on races held at out-of-state racetracks that are simulcast to the racetrack. In addition, the Canterbury Park Card Casino operates 24 hours a day, seven days a week and is also regulated by the Minnesota Racing Commission. Casino games include blackjack, baccarat, Ultimate Texas Hold 'Em and poker. Canterbury Park also derives revenue from related services and activities, such as concessions, parking, admissions and programs, and from other entertainment events held at the racetrack. Furthermore, Canterbury Park is pursuing a strategy to enhance shareholder value by developing approximately 140 acres of underutilized land surrounding the racetrack in a project known as Canterbury Commons. The company is pursuing several mixed-use development opportunities for the underutilized land, directly and through joint ventures.

Canterbury Park has hosted the Claiming Crown of horseracing for all but four years since its inception in 1999. The inaugural Mystic Lake Derby, offering the largest purse at the track since 1991, was run on July 28, 2012.  The race was won by the 3-year-old Hammers Terror in a time of 1:37.18 over the one-mile turf event.

The park also includes a card club. A two-week series of poker tournaments, Fall Poker Classic, is held each fall at Canterbury Park.

History

Canterbury Downs was founded by Walter Brooks Fields Jr., and other investors. According to David Miller of the Daily Racing Form, "Fields, along with his nephew Brooks Hauser, formed Minnesota Racetrack Inc. after a constitutional amendment allowing parimutuel wagering on horse racing was approved by Minnesota voters in 1982. Naming Santa Anita as its primary partner, Minnesota Racetrack Inc. was awarded the state's first racetrack license by the Minnesota Racing Commission and the facility in Shakopee held its first race on June 26, 1985. The introduction of the state's lottery and the widespread growth of casino gaming at Native American-hosted facilities in the area saw Canterbury Downs business repeatedly fall below revenue projections, and the track was sold in 1990 to Ladbroke Racing PLC."

In 1990, Ladbroke Racing Corporation bought Canterbury and renamed it New Canterbury Downs. In December 1992, it closed its doors after a disastrous live racing season that saw an enormous drop in attendance. In late 1993, Canterbury was bought by Irwin L. Jacobs, who quickly sold it to Curtis and Randy Sampson. Shortly after the sale, the Sampsons worked to revitalize Canterbury, so that it reopened its doors to simulcasting, and it quickly paid off its debt. In late 1994, Canterbury carried out a promise to return live horse racing to Minnesota. In January 1995, Canterbury Downs officially changed its name to Canterbury Park.

In 1999 the legislature authorized a card room with poker tables at Canterbury Park. This had the effect of allowing poker tables at the state's Indian tribe casinos as well.

Due to the 2011 Minnesota state government shutdown, Canterbury was forced to close. Ramsey County District Judge Kathleen Gearin rejected a court case by Canterbury's owners to reopen it. Canterbury Park reopened on July 20, 2011, when the government shutdown ended.

In June 2012, Canterbury Park and the Shakopee Mdewakanton Sioux Community, owners and operators of Mystic Lake Casino, announced a 10-year cooperative marketing and purse enhancement agreement that will add $75 million to horsemen purses.

Canterbury Park also hosts corgi dog races, wiener dog races, and the annual Running of the Bulldogs.

Staff members include KFAN radio personality and Vikings announcer Paul Allen and FOX Sports North commentator Kevin Gorg.

In 2019, Canterbury Park was the site of the Twin Cities Summer Jam.

References

External links

Canterbury Park Card Club Review

Horse racing venues in Minnesota
Buildings and structures in Scott County, Minnesota
Casinos in Minnesota
Sports venues in Minneapolis–Saint Paul
1985 establishments in Minnesota
Tourist attractions in Scott County, Minnesota
Companies listed on the Nasdaq
Sports venues completed in 1985